A government contractor is a company (privately owned, publicly traded or a state-owned enterprise)either for profit or non-profitthat produces goods or services under contract for the government. Some communities are largely sustained by government contracting activity; for instance, much of the economy of Northern Virginia consists of government contractors employed directly or indirectly by the federal government of the United States.

United Kingdom
Section 12(2) and (3) of the Official Secrets Act 1989 define the expression 
"Government Contractor" for the purposes of that Act.

See also
Defense contractor
Beltway bandit

References

Government procurement